The 1889 Staten Island Athletic Club football team was an American football team that represented the Staten Island Athletic Club of West Brighton, which was likely a different organization than the Staten Island Cricket Club, in the American Football Union (AFU) during the 1889 college football season. The athletic club originally played on a pre-determined AFU schedule, but after its resignation from the league on November 1, the remaining games were no longer mandatory.  However, they still continued to play league opponents for the remainder of the season, sticking to the original schedule to not disarrange the schedule for the rest of the schools in the union.  The team finished its season with a 0–6 record (0–3 in the AFU), and did not score a single point against another opponent, losing by a total of 232 to 0.

Schedule

References

Staten Island Athletic Club
Athletic Club football teams and seasons
Staten Island Athletic Club football
College football winless seasons